"Building the City of Light" is a song from Scottish singer-songwriter Mike Scott, which was released as the second and final single from his first solo album Bring 'Em All In. It was written by Mike Scott, and produced by Scott and Niko Bolas. The song reached No. 60 in the UK Singles Chart and remained in the top 100 for two weeks.

Background
Much of the material on Bring 'Em All In was written after Scott left New York City for Scotland in 1993. During a period when he stayed at the Findhorn Foundation, he wrote many of the songs that appeared on the album and first performed "Building the City of Light", among other tracks, at the foundation's Universal Hall. At the time of its release, Scott described "Building the City of Light" as "a three and a half minute power blast with lyrics about bringing more love into the world, starting with myself".

When the previous single "Bring 'Em All In" stalled at No. 56 in the UK, Chrysalis persuaded Scott to release "Building the City of Light" with different bonus tracks on two separate CD releases in the bid to generate additional sales and a hit single. In his autobiography, Scott recalled how he felt the plan was merely a "music business ploy" and a "scam". With "Building the City of Light" only reaching No. 60 in the UK, Scott recalled: "The single bombed and I felt I'd compromised myself, the fans and the music."

Music video
The song's music video was directed by Scott and David Anderson, and produced by Elizabeth Flowers.

Critical reception
In a review of Bring 'Em All In, Kevin O'Hare, writing for the Star Tribune described the song as a "fiery closer". Dan Bennett of the North County Times wrote: "On songs such as "Sensitive Children" and "Building the City of Light", Scott has attempted to fashion a complete observational and self-realization journey in one package."

Trouser Press commented: "...Scott is still carried away with his new age idealism: the lyrics of "Long Way to the Light" and "Building the City of Light" are both so insufferably earnest and overpoweringly positive that they distract all attention away from any merits the music might have." Chuck Groth of the St. Louis Post-Dispatch felt "Building the City of Light" was one of the album's tracks that was "forced and melodramatic".

Formats

Personnel
Building the City of Light
 Mike Scott - all vocals and instruments, producer
 Niko Bolas - producer, recording, engineering, mixing
 Greg Calbi, Scott Hull - mastering

Where Do You Want the Boombox, Buddy?
 Mike Scott - producer
 Chris Bruce - lead guitar
 Brian Stanley - bass
 Steve Holley - drums
 Niko Bolas - recording, mixing

Other
 Mike Scott - cover concept
 Jill Furmanovsky - photography
 Stylorouge - design

Charts

References

1995 songs
1995 singles
Chrysalis Records singles
Songs written by Mike Scott (musician)
Song recordings produced by Mike Scott (musician)
Song recordings produced by Niko Bolas